Jem Bendell is a British professor of sustainability leadership and founder of the Institute for Leadership and Sustainability (IFLAS) at the University of Cumbria. He has written about monetary economics and the need for 'Deep Adaptation' in response to environmental crises. He regularly comments on current affairs and approaches that may help humanity face climate-induced disruption. In 2019 he founded the Deep Adaptation Forum to support responses to hypothetical societal disruption from the perceived dangers of climate change.

Career
Bendell graduated from the University of Cambridge in 1995 with a degree in Geography, beginning his career at the World Wide Fund for Nature UK. There, he helped to develop the Forest Stewardship Council and the Marine Stewardship Council. He specialised on relationships between NGOs and business, pointing out their potential, despite the power inequities and the way in which business agendas tend to prevail over those of the non-profit sector.

He earned a PhD from the University of Bristol.

He also became involved in the anti-globalisation movement, later writing a United Nations report on the conflict between business and civil society.  He founded Lifeworth, a progressive professional services company mostly working with UN agencies and worked part time as an associate professor of management at Griffith Business School.

After his time consulting for the United Nations, in 2012 Bendell joined Cumbria University and founded the Institute for Leadership and Sustainability (IFLAS). On account of this work, the World Economic Forum named him a Young Global Leader. In a 2011 TEDx talk he expanded his focus to monetary reform and complementary currencies, mentioning Bitcoin, and predicting that Facebook would launch their own currency.

In 2006, Bendell worked with the World Wide Fund for Nature UK, analysing and ranking the social and environmental performance of luxury brands. His resulting report, Deeper Luxury: Quality and Style When the World Matters, was discussed internationally in over 50 newspapers as of late 2007. The report argued that luxury brands were not meeting the expectations of customers for high performance on social and environmental issues.

In the 2017 United Kingdom general election, he provided strategic communication advice to the Leader of the Labour Party.

As of 2008, he had published over fifty publications, two books, and four United Nations reports. In his 2014 book Healing Capitalism, Bendell proposes a new way of respecting private property whereby ownership rights would place a duty on owners (and their fiduciaries) to maintain demonstrable accountability to anyone directly affected by their property. This need for "capital accountability" would compel shareholders to be as interested in how corporations are accountable to stakeholders as they would be in either share price or dividends.

Deep Adaptation 

Deep Adaptation is a paper that Bendell self-published in July 2018. The concept of "Deep Adaptation" purports that humanity needs to prepare for the possibility of fundamental societal collapse, as global warming and extreme weather events increasingly disrupt social, economic, and political systems. Unlike climate change adaptation, which aims to adapt societies gradually to the effects of climate change, Deep Adaptation is premised on acceptance of impending abrupt transformations of the environment. This paper had been previously rejected by the peer review process of the Sustainability Accounting, Management and Policy Journal. According to climate scientist Michael E. Mann, this was because "it lacks scientific rigor."

Responses to the paper are split among academics and popular audiences. Some reviewers dismiss Deep Adaptation as a poorly substantiated, doomist framing that threatens to hamper true efforts to address climate change adaptation. Others contend that Bendell successfully provides an alternative framework through which impacts of climate change may be approached. The paper has achieved popularity, having been downloaded hundreds of thousands of times and providing the nucleus for online communities with thousands of members.

Selected bibliography

Bendell, Jem (2018-07-27). "Deep adaptation: a map for navigating climate tragedy".

References

External links
Links to various versions of the Deep Adaption paper, including the original blog post, a Kindle version, an audio MP3 file, as well as a variety of translations
Deep Adaptation Forum website
Articles by Bendell at Open Democracy
Articles by Bendell at The Guardian

Place of birth missing (living people)
Year of birth missing (living people)
Living people
Academics of the University of Cumbria
Alumni of the University of Bristol
Alumni of the University of Cambridge
Sustainability advocates
Monetary economists